Yudelkis Fernández Luis (born 28 February 1985 in Minas, Camagüey) is a Cuban long jumper.

Personal bests
Outdoot
Long jump: 6.74 m A (wind: +0.4 m/s) –  México City, 22 May 2004
Triple jump: 14.10 m (wind: +0.4 m/s) –  Havana, 17 March 2007
Indoor
Long jump: 6.40 m (wind: +0.4 m/s) –  Valencia, 10 February 2007

Competition record

External links

Sports reference biography
Ecured biography (in Spanish)

1985 births
Living people
Cuban female long jumpers
Athletes (track and field) at the 2004 Summer Olympics
Olympic athletes of Cuba
Central American and Caribbean Games gold medalists for Cuba
Competitors at the 2006 Central American and Caribbean Games
Central American and Caribbean Games medalists in athletics
Athletes (track and field) at the 2007 Pan American Games
Pan American Games competitors for Cuba
People from Camagüey Province
21st-century Cuban women